David Bryant may refer to:

 David Ezekiel Bryant (1845–1910), United States federal judge
 Charles David Jones Bryant (1883–1937), Australian marine artist
 David Bryant (bowls) (1931–2020), English bowls player and world champion
 David Bryant Mumford (born 1937), American mathematician
 David Bryant (musician) (born 1970), Canadian musician and film director
 David R. Bryant (born 1936), American chemist
 David Bryant (cricketer) (born 1950), English cricketer
 David Bryant (triathlete) (born 1989), Australian triathlete